Nadoxolol is an antiarrhythmic agent (i.e., a drug for the treatment of irregular heartbeat), chemically related in structure to beta-adrenergic receptor blocker drugs such as propranolol.

It does not appear to be marketed anywhere in the world.

References

Antiarrhythmic agents
1-Naphthyl compounds